Peter Marchitelli (Villa Santa Maria, 1643 - Naples, 1729) was an Italian violinist, and teacher of Michele Mascitti.

Life
He was born in 1643 in the province of Chieti in Villa Santa Maria. He received a formal music education at the Conservatory of S. Mary of Loreto in 1657. Recognized as a talented violinist and teacher, Marchitelli took the role of first violin in the most prestigious musical institutions in Naples: the Chapel Royal of Naples and the orchestra of the Teatro San Bartolomeo. He was a close friend of Alessandro Scarlatti during his career, and held in high esteem by his contemporaries. Marchitelli died of old age and was buried at the Chiesa di San Nicola alla Carità in Naples, in 1729. He owned seven beloved Cremonese violins, three violets and a guitar.

References
Guido Olivieri “’Si suona a Napoli!’ I rapporti fra Napoli e Parigi e i primordi della Sonata in Francia,” Studi Musicali 35 (1996): 409-27.

Guido Olivieri “Musica strumentale a Napoli nell'età di Pergolesi: le sonate per tre violini e basso” , Studi Pergolesiani 4 (2000): 193–207.

Guido Olivieri “Condizione sociale dei musicisti nella Napoli del ‘700: Pietro Marchitelli,” in Napoli musicalissima. Studi in onore di R. Di Benedetto, (Lucca: LIM, 2006), 45–68.

Guido Olivieri, Pietro Marchitelli in DBI (2007)

1643 births
1729 deaths
Italian violinists
Male violinists